Landouria winteriana is a species of gastropods belonging to the family Camaenidae.

The species is found in Malesia.

References

Camaenidae
Gastropods described in 1842